Badmal railway station is a railway station on the East Coast Railway network in the state of Odisha, India. It serves Badmal village. Its code is BUDM. It has two platforms. Passenger, Express and Superfast trains halt at Badmal railway station.

Major trains

 Dhanbad–Alappuzha Express
 Puri–Durg Express
 Ispat Express
 Lokmanya Tilak Terminus–Puri Superfast Express (via Titlagarh)
 Sambalpur–Rayagada Intercity Express
 Tapaswini Express
 Samaleshwari Express

See also
 Balangir district

References

Railway stations in Balangir district
Sambalpur railway division